The Guanabara Confession of Faith was a Calvinist creed from 1558. The first Protestant writing in Brazil, and in all of the Americas, it was written by the French Huguenots Jean du Bourdel, Matthieu Verneuil, Pierre Bourdon and André la Fon, who were taken under arrest by Villegaignon. Twelve hours after writing it, the authors were hanged.

Guanabara Confession  (1558) 
According to the doctrine of Saint Peter Apostle, in his first epistle, all Christians must be ready to give reason of the hope which is inside them, and this with all meekness and benignity, we sign beneath, Lord of Villegaignon, agreed (according the measure of grace that the Lord has conceded us) to give reason, to each point, how you had appointed and ordered us, and starting by the first article:

I. We believe in one God, immortal, invisible, creator of skies and earth, and all things, visibles and invisibles, who is distinguished in three persons: the Father, the Son and the Holy Ghost, who constitute the same substance in eternal essence and a same will; the Father, source and beginning of all blessing; the Son, eternally beget by the Father, who, fulfilled the plenty of time, came in flesh to the world, being conceived by the Holy Ghost, was born by the virgin Mary, breed under the law to rescue those who were under the law, in order to we receive the adoption of His own sons; the Holy Ghost, proceeding by the Father and the Son, master of all Truth, speaking by the prophets, inspiring the things which were said by our Lord Jesus Christ to the apostles. He is the unique Consoler in affliction, giving constancy and perseverance in all good.
We believe that is mister only worship and perfectly love, beg and invoke the majesty of God in faith or individually.

II. Worshipping our Lord Jesus Christ, we don't separate one nature from other, confessing the two natures, namely, divine and human, which are inseparable.

III. We believe, concerning to the Son of God and the Holy Spirit, what the Word of God and the apostolic doctrine, and the symbol, teach us.

IV. We believe our Lord Jesus Christ will judge living and dead people, in a visible and human form like He ascended to the heaven, executing such judgement, in the form that predict us in twenty-fifth chapter of the Gospel of Matthew, having all the power to judge, given by the Father, being man.
And, concerning our prayers, the Father will appear in the Son, we understand this because the power of the Father given to the Son will manifest in that judgement, but we don't want to confound the people, because they are really distinguished one of other.

V. We believe in the holy sacrament of the supper, with the corporal figures of the bread and the wine, the faithful souls are really and actually feed with the very substance of our Lord Jesus, as our bodies are feed with food, even so we don't want to say that the bread and the wine be transformed or transubstantiated in His body, because the bread keeps in its nature and substance, like the wine, and there is no change or alteration.
However, we distinguish this bread and wine from other bread which is dedicated to habitual use, because this is a sacramental sign, which the truth is infallibly received. Nevertheless, this receipt is made only by the faith and we cannot imagine as being fleshly, neither prepare the teeth to eat, as said St. Augustine: "Why do you prepares the teeth and the stomach? Believe, and you have eaten."
Therefore, the sign does not give us the truth, neither the thing which is denoted; but our Lord Jesus Christ, by His power, virtue and kindness feeds and preserves our souls, and make they partners in His flesh and His blood, and all of His benefactions.
Let us see the explanation of Jesus' words: "This is my body." Tertullian, in the fourth book against Marcion, explain in this way: "this is the sign and the figure of my body."
St. Augustine says: "The Lord doesn't avoid to say: 'This is my body', when he just give the sign of his body."
Hence (as it is ordered in the first canon of the Council of Nicea), in this holy sacrament we can't imagine nothing fleshly and distract in the bread and the wine, which are proposed by signs, but elevate our spirit to the skies and contemplate by the faith the Son of God, our Lord Jesus, seat at the right of God, His Father.
In this way, we could swear the article about the Ascension, along with many other sentences of Augustine, which we are omitting, because they are long.

VI. We believe that, if it was necessary to put water in the wine, the evangelists and St. Paul would not had omitted a thing of so great consequence.
And concerning to what the ancient doctors have observed (basing themselves about the blood mixed with water that left of the side of Jesus Christ, since this observance does not have any basis in the Scripture, seen very after the establishment of the Lord's Supper when this happened), we cannot admit, necessarily.

VII. We believe that there is no other dedication but that which is made by the minister, when the Lord's Supper, reciting the minister to the people, in a known language, the institution of this sacrament literally, according to the way that our Lord Jesus Christ taught us, admonishing the people concerning to the death and passion of our Lord. And, as said St. Augustine, the dedication is the word of faith that is preached and received in faith. For this, it results that the words mysteriously pronounced cannot be the dedication as it appears of the institution that our Lord Jesus Christ let to His apostles, directing His words to the current disciples, which he ordered drink and eat.

VIII. The holy sacrament of the Lord's Supper is not food for the body as it is to the souls (because we realize nothing fleshly, as we declare in the fifth article) receiving by faith, which is not fleshly.

IX. We believe that baptism is the sacrament of penitence, and as an ingress in the Church of God, to be incorporate in Jesus Christ. Represent to us the remission of our past and future sins, which completely acquired only by the death of our Lord Jesus Christ.
Moreover, the mortification of our flesh is represented to us here, and the washing, represented by the water put on the child, it is the sign and seal of our Lord Jesus, which is the true purification of our souls. The institution of this sacrament is taught to us in the Word of God, which the holy apostles observed, utilizing water in name of the Father, the Son and the Holy Ghost. Concerning the exorcism, abjurations of Satan, chrism, spittle and salt, we register them as men's traditions, we contend only with the way ad institution let to us by our Lord Jesus.

X. Concerning free will, we believe that, if the first man, created upon the image of God, had freedom and will, for both good and evil, only he knew what free will was, being integer. Thus, he not only kept this gift of God, but he was also deprived by his sin, and thus all who descend from him, in the sense that no seed of Adam has a spark of goodness.

For this reason, says Saint Paul, the natural man does not understand the things of God. And Hosea claim to the children of Israel: “Thy damnation is thou, o Israel.” We understand this about the man who is not regenerated by the Holy Spirit.

Concerning the Christian man, baptized in the blood of Jesus Christ, who walks in novelty of life, our Lord Jesus Christ restores his free will, and reforms the will for all good works, not however in perfection, because the execution of the good will is not on his power, but comes from God, as the holy apostle amply declares, in the seventh chapter to the Romans, saying: “I have the want, but I cannot realize by myself.”

The predestined man to the eternal life, although he may sin for his human frailty, however cannot fall in impenitence.

On this purpose, St. John says he does not sin, because the election remains in him.

XI. We believe that the pardon of sins belongs only to the Word of God, from which says Saint Ambrose, the man is only the minister; thus, if he condemns or acquits, it is not him, but the Word of God which he announces.

Saint Augustine, in this place says it is not by the merit of men that sins are forgiven, but by the virtue of the Holy Spirit. Because the Lord say to His apostles: “receive the Holy Spirit;” and then adds: “if you forgive other’s sins”, etc.

Cyprian says the servant cannot forgive the offense against the Lord.

XIII. Concerning the imposition of hands, this one served in its time, and there is no necessity of conserving it now, because by the imposition of hands, one cannot give the Holy Spirit, because this only belongs to God.

Concerning the ecclesiastic order, we believe in what St. Paul wrote about it in the first epistle to Timothy, and in other places.

XIII. The separation between man and woman who were legitimaly united by a marriage cannot be unmade but by adultery, as our Lord teaches (Matthew 19:5). And the separation can not only be made by this cause but also, after examination by a magistrate, the non-guilty part, if cannot contain himself, should marry, as Saint Ambrose says about the seventh chapter of the first epistle to Corinthians. The magistrate, however, should proceed with maturity in his advice.

XIV. Saint Paul, teaching the bishop should husband of only one woman, do not say that it is illicit to marry again, but the saint apostle condemns the bigamy that most men from those times were inured; however, we let the judgment to the ones who are more versed in the Holy Scriptures, and we do not found our faith in this point.

XV. It is not licit to vow to God, unless what He approves. Thus the monastic vows only tend to corrupt the true service to God. And it is also great temerity and presumption of the man to vow beyond his vocation, because the Holy Scripture teaches us that continence is a special gift (Matthew 15 and First Corinthians 7). Thus, it follows that the ones who impose themselves this necessity, renouncing the matrimony of their entire lives, cannot be excused of extreme temerity and excessive, insolent confidence in themselves.

And thus they tempt God, because the gift of continence is only temporal in some people, and the one who had it for some time will not have it for the entire life. For this, monks, priests and others that oblige and promise to live in chastity, they tempt God, for this reason it is not in them what they promise.

Saint Cyprian, in chapter eleven, says: “If the virgins dedicate themselves in good will to Christ, let them persevere in chastity without defect; being strong and constant, let they wait the reward prepared for their virginity; if they do not want or cannot persevere in their vows, it is better they marry than being precipitated in the fire of lust with its pleasures and delicacies.” Concerning the fragment of apostle St. Paul, it is true that the widows that serve the church did not marry anymore, while they were subject to that role, not because this reputed or attributed a certain holiness, but because they could not carry out their duties being married; and, if they wanted to marry, they should renounce to the vocation which God had called them, as long as they fulfilled the promises made in the church, without violating the promise made in the baptism, in which is present in this point: ‘That everyone should serve God in the vocation He called you.’ The widows, thus, did not make continence vow, because marriage did not suit to the office they were assigned, and they did not have any other consideration than accomplish it. They were not constrained that it was better they were allowed to marry than becoming excited and fall in infamy or dishonesty.”

But, to avoid such inconvenience, apostle Saint Paul, in the cited chapter, forbade them to make such vows, unless they had sixty years, which is an age usually not subject to incontinence. He adds that the elects should be married once, in order to have one approval of continence.

XVI. We believe Jesus Christ is our only intermediary, intercessor and advocate, from who we access to the Father, and that, justifies in His blood, we will be free of death, and by him we are already reconciled and we have whole victory against death.

Concerning the holy dead, we say they wish for our salvation and the fulfillment of the Kingdom of God, that the number of the elects may be whole; however, we should not go after them as intercessors to obtain anything, because we would disobey the commandment of God. Concerning us, who are alive, while we are united as members of one body, we should pray for each other, as many parts of the Holy Scriptures teaches us.

XVII. Concerning the dead, Saint Paul, in the first epistle to Thessalonians, in the fourth chapter, forbids us to sad for them, because this suits the pagans, that have no hope of resurrection. The apostle does not nor teaches us to pray from, and he would not forget if it was convenient. St. Augustine, about Psalms 48, says that the spirits of the dead receive according to what they have done in life; if they did nothing, while alive, they receive nothing, in their death.

This is the answer we give to the article sent by you, according the measure and portion of faith that God gave us, praying for that this faith is not to be killed in us, but that bear fruit worthy of his children, and thus, making us grow and persevere in it, we may give praise forever. Amen.

Jean du Bourdel, Matthieu Verneuil, Pierre Bourdon, André la Fon.

References

Christian statements of faith
Protestantism in Brazil
France Antarctique